Flipper may refer to:

Common meanings
Flipper (anatomy), a forelimb of an aquatic animal, useful for steering and/or propulsion in water
Alternate name for a swimfin, footwear that boosts human swimming efficiency
Flipper (cricket), a type of delivery bowled by a wrist spin bowler
Flipper (pinball), a part of a pinball machine used to strike the ball
A speculator who engages in flipping (buying and selling quickly)
Flipper (tool), used for flipping food over while cooking

Boats
Flipper (US dinghy), an American sailing dinghy design
Flipper (dinghy), a Danish sailing dinghy design

Film and television
Flipper (1963 film), about a bottlenose dolphin named Flipper
Flipper's New Adventure (1964), sequel to the 1963 film
Flipper (1964 TV series), an adaptation of the 1963 film which originally ran from 1964 to 1967
Flipper (1995 TV series), a revival of the 1964 series which ran from 1995 to 2000
Flipper (1996 film), a remake of the 1963 film starring Paul Hogan and Elijah Wood
Flipper, one of the title characters of the Australian animated series Flipper and Lopaka

Music
Die Flippers, a German Schlager group
Die Flippers (album), the group's first studio album, released in 1970
Flipper (band), a punk band from San Francisco, California
Flipper, a former member of the lesbian punk band Tribe 8

Military
Operation Flipper, a British World War II commando raid with the goal of assassinating Erwin Rommel
Flipper, NATO reporting name of the Mikoyan-Gurevich Ye-152A Soviet fighter aircraft
M138 "Flipper" portable mine layer, see GEMSS mine system

People
Henry Ossian Flipper (1856–1940), first African-American cadet to graduate from West Point
Willie Flipper Anderson (born 1965), former National Football League wide receiver
Kirsten Flipkens (born 1986), Belgian tennis player
Leandro Ruiz Machado (born 1977), Brazilian water polo player
Carmen Milano (1929–2006), American disbarred lawyer and mobster

Other uses
Flipper (mascot), Miami Dolphins mascot from 1966 to 1968
Flipper (robot combat), a device used to flip over opposing robots
the ATI-produced Graphics Processing Unit chip used in the Nintendo GameCube videogame console

See also 
 Flip (disambiguation)

Lists of people by nickname